Holy Family is a Christian term for Jesus, the Virgin Mary and St. Joseph.

Holy Family may also refer to:

Book
The Holy Family (book), by Karl Marx and Friedrich Engels written in 1844

Art
:Category:Paintings of the Holy Family

The Holy Family with the Dragonfly, a 1495 engraving by German artist Albrecht Dürer
Holy Family and donors (Carpaccio), a 1505 painting by Italian artist Vittore Carpaccio
 Doni Tondo, a circa 1507 (probably between 1503 and 1508) painting by Michelangelo
Canigiani Holy Family (Raphael), a 1508 painting by Italian artist Raphael
Holy family and Saints (Pontormo), a 1516 painting by Italian artist Jacopo Pontormo
Holy Family (Andrea del Sarto), a 1529 painting by Italian artist Andrea Sarto
Holy Family with Saints Anne and John the Baptist (Luini), a c.1530 oil on panel painting by Bernardino Luini
The Holy Family with Saint John the Baptist and an Angel, a c. 1535–1540 oil on panel painting by Il Sodoma
The Holy Family with Saint John the Baptist, a c. 1550–1560 oil on panel painting by Nosadella
Holy Family (Costa), a 16th-century painting by Italian artist Lorenzo Costa
Holy Family (El Greco, Museo de Santa Cruz), a 1588 painting by Greek artist El Greco
Holy Family (El Greco, Hospital de Tavera), a 1595 painting by Greek artist El Greco
The Holy Family with Angels, 1645 painting by Dutch artist Rembrandt
The Holy Family (Collinson painting), an 1878 painting by British artist James Collinson

Film
The Holy Family (film), a 2006 television drama film

Television 
 Holy Family (TV series), a 2022 television series

Religious buildings
Holy Family Cathedral (disambiguation)
Holy Family Church (disambiguation)
Holy Family Shrine

Educational institutions
Holy Family Catholic High School (disambiguation)
Holy Family High School (disambiguation)
Holy Family School (disambiguation)

Philippines
Holy Family Academy (Philippines), a K-12 school in Angeles City

United Kingdom
Holy Family Catholic Academy, a secondary school in Cleethorpes, Lincolnshire, England, now Beacon Academy, Cleethorpes
Holy Family Roman Catholic and Church of England College, a secondary school in Heywood, Greater Manchester, England

United States
Holy Family Academy (New Hampshire), a junior/ senior high school in Manchester
Holy Family Academy (Bayonne, New Jersey), a high school
Holy Family University, Pennsylvania, near Philadelphia